The 27th Infantry Division was a unit of the Army National Guard in World War I and World War II. The division traces its history from the New York Division, formed originally in 1908. The 6th Division designation was changed to the 27th Division in July 1917.

History 
When the New York Division was organized in 1908, New York became the second state, after Pennsylvania, to structure its National Guard at such a high tactical level in peacetime. The New York Division was called to active duty during the Mexican border crisis of 1916. While on federal duty, it was redesignated as the 6th Division in June 1916. It was released from active duty in December 1916, only to be recalled for World War I service in July 1917. The 6th Division was reorganized and redesignated as the 27th Division on 1 October 1917.

World War I

Formation 
Following the declaration of war on the Central Powers by the United States, the division was called into federal service on 15 July 1917, and hastily recruited New Yorkers to increase its numbers.

The division was one of only three divisions formed from units entirely from a single state's National Guard; the other two being Illinois and Pennsylvania. However, not all New Yorkers served in the 27th. Its initial strength was 991 officers and 27,114 enlisted men. The division's initial organization of three brigades with three infantry regiments each was carried over from the 6th Division

Prior to its departing to training, the division participated in a large send-off parade in New York City along 5th Avenue on 30 August 1917. The 7th Infantry Regiment was the first to leave for training on 11 September 1917, by train. The training was conducted at a purpose-built temporary facility at Camp Wadsworth, Spartanburg, South Carolina. Nearby hotels such as the Cleveland Hotel became centers for social life. The camp also housed seven YMCA Huts and a Knights of Columbus Hall. While the 27th had African-American service-men they were not permitted to enter the service organization clubs on base, which were segregated, until a black soldier's club was built in early 1918.

In the spring of 1918, the division began its movement toward embarkation camps, and shipped out on 20 April 1918. The division's advance detachment left Hoboken on 2 May and arrived at Brest, France, 10 May 1918. Late in June the last units of the Twenty-Seventh Division had arrived safely overseas.

Western Front 
From the arrival of the first troops to the Western Front until 24 July, the division spent its time undertaking its final stages of training under British mentors in Picardy and Flanders. On 25 July, the 27th Division, excluding its artillery brigade and ammunition train, occupied the Dickebusch Lake and Scherpenberg sectors in Flanders.

In just over a month, this operation merged into the Ypres-Lys action, and then, from 19 August to 3 September, the 27th was on its own.

It was decided by Field marshal Douglas Haig that the Fourth Army's Australian Corps would lead the Battle of St. Quentin Canal    . However, due to the Corps depleted nature, which was a result of fighting almost continuously, it would be reinforced by the 27th and 30th divisions, which resulted in II Corps being temporarily reassigned under Australian command. This great Somme "push", which lasted from 24 September to 1 October, saw the 27th engaged in severe fighting along the Saint Quentin Canal Tunnel—one of the out-lying strong points of the Hindenburg Line. At the conclusion of the first phase of the battle, and following heavy losses, the 27th was placed into reserve for rest and recuperation. Six days later, the division was sent back into the line, moving steadily toward Busigny whilst chasing the retreating Germans. These operations were supported by Australian Artillery until 9 October, when British artillery units began supporting the division's operations. As a result of these offensives by the Australian, British and US forces,  the Hindenburg's Main Line was penetrated.

The 52d Field Artillery Brigade and the 102nd Ammunition Train of the New York Division had not gone with the rest of the Twenty-seventh Division to the British front in Flanders. They had moved up on 28 October, to support the Seventy-Ninth Division in the Argonne.

Meanwhile, the Twenty-Seventh Division units which had seen heavy action in Flanders, had moved back to an area near the French seaport of Brest.

Major Operations: Meuse-Argonne (only the artillery), Ypres-Lys, Somme Offensive.
Initially stationed in the East Poperinghe Line.
Battle of Dickebusche Lake, Summer 1918
Battle of Vierstraat Ridge, Summer 1918
Struggled to break the German defensive Hindenburg Line, September 1918.
Second battle of the Somme, 25 September 1918
Selle River, November 1918

The 27th did break the Hindenburg line during the Battle of the Somme and forced a German retreat from their defensive line and forced the Germans to a final confrontation. After a final confrontation with the retreating Germans at the Selle River the Armistice ended the fighting and the division was sent home in February 1919, to be mustered out several months later. The division had sustained a total of 8,334 (KIA: 1,442; WIA: 6,892) casualties when it was inactivated in April 1919.

World War II 
On 15 October 1940, the division was called into federal service, and sent to Fort McClellan, Alabama, for training. It was the first division to be deployed in the continental United States, and participated in the 1941 Louisiana Maneuvers. Following the Battle of Pearl Harbor, on 14 December 1941, the division was sent to southern California.

The first stateside division to be deployed in response to the attack on Pearl Harbor, the 27th Division departed Fort McClellan 14 December 1941 for California to establish blocking positions against an anticipated seaborne invasion of the United States southwestern coast.  They were further transferred into the Pacific Theater of Operations and arrived in Hawaii, 21 May 1942, to defend the outer islands from amphibious attack. The 165th Infantry (the once and future 69th Infantry) and 3rd Battalion, 105th Infantry first saw action against the enemy during the attack and capture of Makin Atoll in the Gilbert Islands, 21–24 November 1943. The 1st and 3rd Battalions of the 106th Regiment participated in the attack on Eniwetok Atoll, 19–26 February 1944, returning to Oahu in March. During this mission, the 2nd Battalion, 106th Infantry landed unopposed on Majuro Island, 1 February, and completed its seizure, 3 February. The division began preparations for the Marianas operations, 15 March. On D-day plus 1, 16 June 1944, elements landed at night on Saipan to support the Second and Fourth Marine Divisions. A beachhead was established and Aslito Airfield captured, 18 June. Fighting continued throughout June. Marine General Holland Smith, unsatisfied with the performance of the 27th Division, relieved its commander, Army General Ralph C. Smith., which led to angry recrimination from senior Army commanders, including Army Chief of Staff George C. Marshall. During a pitched battle, 7 July, Japanese overran elements of the division in a banzai attack, but organized resistance was crushed the next day. During the months of July and August, the 27th cleaned out isolated pockets in the mountains and cliffs of Saipan.

Beginning in the middle of August, the division moved to the New Hebrides for rest and rehabilitation. On
25 March 1945, the 27th sailed from Espiritu Santo, arriving at Okinawa, 9 April 1945. The Division participated in the XXIV Corps general attack, 19 April 1945, securing a dominating ridge line south of Machinato and Kakazu. Machinato Airfield was captured, 28 April, after a severe struggle. On 1 May, the division was relieved by the 1st Marine Division and attached to the Island Command for garrison duty. Tori Shima was seized, 12 May, without opposition. The 27th attacked from the south end of Ishikawa Isthmus to sweep the northern sector of Okinawa. The enemy fought bitterly on Onnatake Hill from 23 May until 2 June, before losing the strong point. After a mopping-up period, the division left Okinawa, 7 September 1945, moved to Japan and occupied Niigata and Fukushima Prefectures. As a result of the Second World War, the division sustained a total of 6,533 casualties, of those were 1,512 killed in action, 4,980 wounded in action, 40 missing in action, and one prisoner of war.
 Overseas: 10 March 1942.
 Campaigns: Divisional elements participated in various campaigns in the Pacific Theater:
 Distinguished Unit Citations: 2.
 Awards: MH: 3; DSC: 21; DSM: 2 ; Silver Star: 412; LM: 15; SM: 13; BSM: 986; AM: 9.
 Returned to U.S.: 15 December 1945
 Inactivated: 31 December 1945

Postwar 
The division was reformed as a National Guard formation on 21 April 1947. The division was reconstituted along the lines of its wartime structure with limited reorganizations.

In February 1955 the 27th Division became the 27th Armored Division, retaining many of its former units.

The division was reorganized in 1968 as the 27th Armored Brigade, a unit of the 50th Armored Division.

The 27th Armored Brigade was reorganized as an infantry brigade in 1975 and aligned with the 42nd Infantry Division.

In 1985 the 27th Infantry Brigade was activated as part of the New York Army National Guard, and assigned as the "roundout" brigade of the Army's 10th Mountain Division.

The 27th Brigade was later reorganized as the 27th Infantry Brigade Combat Team, and reestablished use of the 27th Infantry Division's NYD shoulder sleeve insignia. The 27th Infantry Brigade carries on the lineage and history of the 27th Infantry Division.

Order of battle

Chain of command deployed, WWI 
 Fourth Army, British Expeditionary Force
 II Corps, American Expeditionary Force

Organization Jul – Nov 1917 
Division Headquarters
1st Brigade
7th Infantry
12th Infantry
14th Infantry
2d Brigade
1st Infantry
23d Infantry
71st Infantry
3d Brigade
2d Infantry
3d Infantry
74th Infantry
Brigade Field Artillery
1st Field Artillery
2d Field Artillery
3d Field Artillery
1st Cavalry
Squadron A and Machine Gun Troop
22d Engineers
1st Battalion, Signal Corps
Trains
Military Police
Ammunition Train
Supply Train
Engineer Train
Sanitary Train
Headquarters Ambulance Companies
1st Ambulance Company
2d Ambulance Company
3d Ambulance Company
4th Ambulance Company
Headquarters Field Hospital
1st Field Hospital
2d Field Hospital
3d Field Hospital
4th Field Hospital

Organization from Nov 1917 

Initially 3 brigades consisting of 3 infantry regiments each, for a total of nine regiments. Reorganized into 2 brigades of 2 infantry regiments each.

 Headquarters, 27th Division

 53rd Infantry Brigade
 105th Infantry Regiment
 106th Infantry Regiment
 105th Machine Gun Battalion
54th Infantry Brigade
 107th Infantry Regiment
 108th Infantry Regiment
 106th Machine Gun Battalion
 52nd Field Artillery Brigade
 104th Field Artillery Regiment (75 mm)
 105th Field Artillery Regiment (75 mm)
 106th Field Artillery Regiment (155 mm)
 102nd Trench Mortar Battery
 104th Machine Gun Battalion
 102nd Engineer Regiment
 102nd Field Signal Battalion
 Headquarters Troop, 27th Division
 102nd Train Headquarters and Military Police
 102nd Ammunition Train
 102nd Supply Train
 102nd Engineer Train
 102nd Sanitary Train
 105th, 106th, 107th, and 108th Ambulance Companies and Field Hospitals

The artillery elements were reassigned upon arrival in France, and did not see service with the 27th Division during combat.

Organization, WWII 
 Headquarters, 27th Infantry Division
 105th Infantry Regiment
 106th Infantry Regiment,
 165th Infantry Regiment
 Headquarters and Headquarters Battery, 27th Infantry Division Artillery

 104th Field Artillery Battalion
 105th Field Artillery Battalion
 106th Field Artillery Battalion
 249th Field Artillery Battalion
 102nd Engineer Combat Battalion
 102nd Medical Battalion
 27th Cavalry Reconnaissance Troop (Mechanized)
 Headquarters, Special Troops, 27th Infantry Division
 Headquarters Company, 27th Infantry Division
 727th Ordnance Light Maintenance Company
 27th Quartermaster Company
 27th Signal Company
 Military Police Platoon
 Band
 27th Counterintelligence Corps Detachment

Organization, 1948 to 1954 
Division Headquarters & Headquarters Co.
Infantry: 105th Infantry Regiment, 108th Infantry Regiment, 174th Infantry Regiment.
Artillery: DIVARTY, 156th Field Artillery Battalion, 170th Field Artillery Battalion, 249th Field Artillery Battalion, 127th AAA Battalion (from 106th AAA, from 7th AAA, from 106th of WW2).
Combat support: 127th Tank Battalion, 152nd Engineer Battalion, 27th Recon Troop, 27th Signal Company
Combat service support: 27th Military Police Company, 727th Ordnance Company, 27th Quartermaster Company, 134th Medical Battalion, 27th Replacement Company.

Commanders

World War I 

Maj. Gen. John F. O'Ryan (16 July 1917);
Brig. Gen. Charles L. Phillips (19 September 1917);
Maj. Gen. J. F. O'Ryan (6 December 1917);
Brig. Gen. C. L. Phillips (23 December 1917);
Maj. Gen. J. F. O'Ryan (29 December 1917);
Brig. Gen. C. L. Phillips (22 February 1918);
Maj. Gen. J. F. O'Ryan (1 March 1918);
Brig. Gen. Palmer E. Pierce (16 June 1918);
Maj. Gen. J. F. O'Ryan (18 June 1918);
Brig. Gen. Palmer E. Pierce (14 November 1918);
Maj. Gen. J. F. O'Ryan (23 November 1918)

World War II 

Maj. Gen. William N. Haskell (October 1940 – October 1941)
 Brig. Gen. Ralph McT. Pennell (November 1941 – October 1942)
 Maj. Gen. Ralph C. Smith (November 1942 – May 1944)
 Maj. Gen. George W. Griner Jr. (June 1944 – December 1945)

References

Bibliography

Further reading 
 
 
 Swetland, Maurice J., and Lilli Swetland. "These Men": "For Conspicuous Bravery Above and Beyond the Call of Duty ...". [Harrisburg, Pa.]: Military Service Pub. Co, 1940. 
 Mitchell A. Yockelson, Borrowed Soldiers: Americans under British Command, 1918, Norman, OK: University of Oklahoma Press, 2008, .

External links 
 Pictorial History of the 27th Division, United States Army, 1940–1941 – New York State Military Museum on New York Heritage Digital Collections
 O'Ryan's Roughnecks

027th Infantry Division, U.S.
Infantry Division, U.S. 027th
Divisions of the United States Army National Guard
United States Army divisions of World War I
Infantry divisions of the United States Army in World War II
Military units and formations established in 1917
Military units and formations disestablished in 1967